Deh Now-e Hushang Khan (also Romanized as Deh Now-e Hūshang Khān) is a village in Khanmirza Rural District, Khanmirza District, Lordegan County, Chaharmahal and Bakhtiari Province, Iran. At the 2006 census, its population was 502, in 99 families. The village is populated by Lurs.

References 

Populated places in Lordegan County
Luri settlements in Chaharmahal and Bakhtiari Province